Savara  is a genus of moths of the family Erebidae. The genus was erected by Francis Walker in 1862.

Species
Savara amisa Swinhoe, 1906 western Sumatra
Savara anomioides (Walker, 1864) Borneo
Savara biradulata Holloway Borneo
Savara contraria Walker, 1862 Borneo, Singapore, New Guinea
Savara latimargo (Walker, [1858]) India, Myanmar, Borneo, Philippines, Sulawesi, Moluccas, New Georgia, Queensland
Savara pallidapex Holloway Borneo
Savara variabilis Pagenstecher, 1888

References

Calpinae
Heteroneura genera